Cessna Township is one of the fifteen townships of Hardin County, Ohio, United States. As of the 2010 census the population was 494.

Geography
Located in the western center of the county, it borders the following townships:
Washington Township - north
Blanchard Township - northeast corner
Pleasant Township - east
Buck Township - southeast
Lynn Township - south
McDonald Township - southwest
Marion Township - west
Liberty Township - northwest corner

No municipalities are located in Cessna Township.

Name and history
Cessna Township was established in 1834, and named in honor of Charles Cessna, a pioneer settler. It is the only Cessna Township statewide.

Government
The township is governed by a three-member board of trustees, who are elected in November of odd-numbered years to a four-year term beginning on the following January 1. Two are elected in the year after the presidential election and one is elected in the year before it. There is also an elected township fiscal officer, who serves a four-year term beginning on April 1 of the year after the election, which is held in November of the year before the presidential election. Vacancies in the fiscal officership or on the board of trustees are filled by the remaining trustees.

References

External links

County website

Townships in Hardin County, Ohio
1834 establishments in Ohio
Populated places established in 1834
Townships in Ohio